The 155th Pennsylvania House of Representatives District is located in Chester County and includes the following areas:

 East Brandywine Township
 East Pikeland Township
 Phoenixville (Part, Ward North)
 Spring City
 Upper Uwchlan Township
 Uwchlan Township
 West Brandywine Township
 West Vincent Township

Representatives

References

Government of Chester County, Pennsylvania
155